The Rebirth of Tragedy is Twelve Tribes's second album.

Track listing
"Post Replica"
"Baboon Music"
"Translation of Fixes"
"Venus Complex"
"Backburner"
"Chroma"
"The Train Bridge"
"Godshaped War"
"Luma"
"Flight of the Pathogen"

Credits
Adam Jackson - vocals  
Andrew Corpus - guitar
Kevin Schindel - guitar
Matt Tackett - bass guitar
Shane Shook  - drums

2004 albums
Twelve Tribes (band) albums